Savenki is a rural locality (a village) in Gamovskoye Rural Settlement, Permsky District, Perm Krai, Russia. The population was 16 as of 2010.

Geography 
Savenki is located 24 km southwest of Perm (the district's administrative centre) by road. Shulgino is the nearest rural locality.

References 

Rural localities in Permsky District